Nong Sano  is a tambon (subdistrict) located in the western region of Buntharik district, in Ubon Ratchathani Province, Thailand. In 2021, it had a population of 16,973 people. Neighbouring subdistricts are (clockwise from the south) Non Kho, Sok Saeng, Bua Ngam of Det Udom district, Na Pho, Ban Maet, Kho Laen, Phon Ngam and Bua Ngam of Buntharik.

History
The subdistrict of Nong Sano was founded in 1969 by splitting off 11 villages in the westernmost area of the Phon Ngam subdistrict.

Geography
The tambon covers 145 km2 and is located in the western region of the Buntharik district. The western part features undulating terrain, while the remainder is primarily low river plains of the Lam Dom Noi River. (ลำโดมน้อย).

Administration
The subdistrict of Nong Sano is divided into 20 villages (mubans; หมู่บ้าน), two of which, Nong Sano and Non Laing villages, were further divided into three and two community groups (Mu; หมู่), respectively. The entire area has been governed by the Subdistrict Administrative Organization of Nong Sano (องค์การบริหารส่วนตำบลหนองสะโน; Nong Sano SAO).

As of the 2021 census, it had a population of 16,973 people with 5,195 households. The following is a list of the subdistrict's mubans, which roughly correspond to the villages.

References

Tambon of Ubon Ratchathani Province